Hanne Malmberg (born 19 November 1964) is a Danish former cyclist. She competed in the women's individual pursuit at the 1992 Summer Olympics.

References

External links
 

1964 births
Living people
Danish female cyclists
Olympic cyclists of Denmark
Cyclists at the 1992 Summer Olympics
People from Upernavik